Hamid Ali is a Bahraini diplomat and the Ambassador Extraordinary and Plenipotentiary of the Kingdom of Bahrain to the Russian Federation.

References

Year of birth missing (living people)
Living people
Ambassadors of Bahrain to Russia